Midila rommeli is a moth in the family Crambidae. It was described by M. G. Lopez-Torres in 1985. It is found in Oaxaca, Mexico.

References

Moths described in 1985
Midilinae